Kurt Schmidt (April 9, 1891 – March 3, 1945) was a German Generalleutnant during the Second World War who also fought during the First World War.

Early life and career
He was born in the German city of Frankfurt on April 9, 1891. In 1909 he joined the German army and on March 20, 1911, he was promoted to Leutnant. He served in the 30th Infantry Regiment.
Four years later, in 1915, he was promoted to Oberleutnant.
He was also awarded the Iron Cross 2nd Class and Iron Cross 1st Class of the Kingdom of Prussia.
Schmidt was wounded during the First World War, and for that he received the Wound Badge in Silver.
He also received the Hanseatic Cross from the city of Hamburg. In the last months of the war he was promoted to Hauptmann (captain).

1930s and World War II
Kurt Schmidt was a member of the staff of the 5th Infantry Division in 1930, in 1931 he was promoted to Major; in 1937 he was promoted to Oberst.
In 1937 the newly promoted Oberst Kurt Schmidt moved with his family to the German town of Hamelin.
When he moved to Hamelin he was commander of Infanterie-Regiment 74. He took part in the invasion of Poland in September 1939. In about November 1940, he became commander of Luxembourg.
Schmidt was the commander of the 702nd Infantry Division in Norway from September 1941 to September 1943. During his time in Norway he was promoted to Generalleutnant, the highest rank he would hold.

Generalleutnant Kurt Schmidt died on March 3, 1945, in Aalsmeer whilst commander of the 526th Reserve Division.
He was first buried at the Nieuwe Oosterbegraafplaats in Amsterdam but later re-buried at the Ysselsteyn German war cemetery.

Summary of his career

Dates of rank
Fähnrich: March 3, 1910
Leutnant, March 20, 1911
Oberleutnant, June 18, 1915
Hauptmann, June 20, 1918
Major, April 1, 1932
Oberstleutnant, July 1, 1934
Oberst, March 1, 1937
Generalmajor, February 1, 1941
Generalleutnant, October 1, 1942

Notable decorations
Iron Cross 1914–1918 Second Class of Prussia
Iron Cross 1914–1918 First Class of Prussia
Wound Badge 1914–1918 in Silver
Hanseatic Cross of the city of Hamburg
War Merit Cross First Class with Swords
Honour Cross of the World War 1914/1918

References

1891 births
1945 deaths
Military personnel from Frankfurt
20th-century Freikorps personnel
Lieutenant generals of the German Army (Wehrmacht)
Recipients of the Iron Cross (1914), 1st class
Burials at Ysselsteyn German war cemetery
People from Hesse-Nassau
German Army personnel killed in World War II
German Army personnel of World War I
German Army generals of World War II
Recipients of the Hanseatic Cross